Eccritotarsini is a tribe of plant bugs in the family Miridae. There are about 14 genera and at least 40 described species in Eccritotarsini.

Genera
These 14 genera belong to the tribe Eccritotarsini:

 Aguayomiris Maldonado Caprilles, 1987 c g b
 Caulotops Bergroth, 1898 i c g b
 Cyrtocapsus Reuter, 1876 i c g
 Eccritotarsus Stal, 1860
 Halticotoma Townsend, 1892 i c g b
 Hemisphaerodella Reuter, 1908 i g
 Hesperolabops Kirkaldy, 1902 i c g b
 Mertila Distant, 1904 i c g
 Pachypoda Carvalho and China, 1951 i c g
 Pycnoderes Guérin-Méneville, 1857 i c g b
 Pycnoderiella Henry, 1993 i c g
 Sixeonotopsis Carvalho and Schaffner, 1974 i c g
 Sixeonotus Reuter, 1876 i c g b
 Sysinas Distant, 1883 i c g
 Tenthecoris Scott, 1886 i c g

Data sources: i = ITIS, c = Catalogue of Life, g = GBIF, b = Bugguide.net

References

Further reading

External links

 

  
Bryocorinae
Articles created by Qbugbot